Hyloxalus excisus is a species of frog in the family Dendrobatidae. It is endemic to Colombia. It is only known from its type locality near Medellín, Antioquia Department, on the Cordillera Central.

Its natural habitats are Andean forests. Its ecology is essentially unknown.

References

excisus
Amphibians of Colombia
Endemic fauna of Colombia
Taxa named by Marco Antonio Serna Díaz
Taxa named by Juan A. Rivero
Amphibians described in 2000
Taxonomy articles created by Polbot